Jean-Baptiste-Joseph de Coriolis de Villeneuve d'Espinouse (1655–1712) was a French aristocrat and public official.

Biography

Early life
Jean-Baptiste-Joseph de Coriolis de Villeneuve d'Espinouse was born in an aristocratic family on January 30, 1655, in Aix-en-Provence. His father, Pierre de Coriolis de Villeneuve d'Espinouse, served as Président à mortier of the Parliament of Aix-en-Provence in 1651, and his paternal grandfather, Honoré de Coriolis, did too in 1625, as did his paternal great-grandfather, Laurent de Coriolis de Corbières, in 1600, and his paternal great-great-grandfather, Louis de Coriolis, in 1568. His mother was named Louise d'Oraison.

Career
Following in his family footsteps, he served as Président à mortier of the Parliament of Aix-en-Provence from 1690 to 1694, after Joseph-Anne de Valbelle de Tourves (1648–1722) and before Silvy Raousset de Boulbon.

Personal life
He married Elisabeth Catherine Grimaldi. They had a son and a daughter:
 Pierre de Coriolis d'Espinouse (1677–1755). He married Félicité de Vintimille. They had a daughter and a son: 
 Françoise de Coriolis (1713–1737).
 François Charles Xavier de Coriolis d'Espinouse (1719–1798). He married Charlotte de Roux de Courbons. They had: 
 Marie Agathe de Coriolis. She married Gilles François de Séran d'Andrieu. They had a son and a daughter:
 Jean-Baptiste François de Séran d'Anglé.
 Henriette Angélique de Séran d'Andrieu (1761–1825).
François Charles Xavier de Coriolis d'Espinouse remarried in 1759 to Antoinette de Montcalm-Gozon (1737–1799). They had a son:
 Charles Louis Alexandre de Coriolis d'Espinouse (1770–1841). He married Henriette d'Estampes (1772–1837). They had a son and a daughter: 
 Charles Auguste de Coriolis d'Espinouse (1804–1871).
 Marie Thérèse Calixte de Coriolis (died 1846).
 Madeleine de Coriolis. She married Jean Baptiste Toussaint d'Arnaud de Rousset. They had four daughters and two sons:
 Magdeleine Félicité d'Arnaud de Rousset.
 Marie Thérèse d'Arnaud de Rousset.
 Louis Charles Marie d'Arnaud de Rousset. He married Marie Louise Gabrielle de Bruny. They had a son and three daughters: 
 Joseph François d'Arnaud de Rousset.
 Marie Thérèse Adélaïde d'Arnaud de Rousset.
 Madeleine Félicité d'Arnaud de Rousset.
 Marguerite Sophie d'Arnaud de Rousset.
 Pierre François d'Arnaud de Rousset.
 Charlotte d'Arnaud de Rousset.
 Marie Henriette d'Arnaud de Rousset.

He died on January 12, 1712, in Espinouse.

References

1655 births
1712 deaths
People from Aix-en-Provence
Provencal nobility